Mount Kimball is the highest mountain in the section of the eastern Alaska Range between Isabel Pass (traversed by the Richardson Highway) and Mentasta Pass (traversed by the Glenn Highway), about 30 miles from Paxson. It is one of the twenty most topographically prominent peaks in Alaska.

Mount Kimball is a relatively difficult climb for a peak with low absolute elevation, due to difficult ridge terrain, and it rebuffed eight climbing attempts by experienced Alaskan mountaineers before its first ascent in 1969. Due to its remoteness, difficulty, and low stature compared to other major Alaskan summits, the peak is not often climbed.


See also

List of mountain peaks of North America
List of mountain peaks of the United States
List of mountain peaks of Alaska
List of Ultras of the United States

References

External links

 Mount Kimball on bivouac.com

Kimball, Mount
Landforms of Southeast Fairbanks Census Area, Alaska
Kimball